Luis Stephens (born 21 May 1938) is a Mexican fencer. He competed in the individual and team épée events at the 1972 Summer Olympics.

References

External links
 

1938 births
Living people
Mexican male épée fencers
Olympic fencers of Mexico
Fencers at the 1972 Summer Olympics
20th-century Mexican people